Elda Gómez Lugo (born 13 January 1941) is a Mexican politician affiliated with the Institutional Revolutionary Party. As of 2014 she served as Deputy of the LX Legislature of the Mexican Congress representing the State of Mexico.

References

1941 births
Living people
Politicians from the State of Mexico
Women members of the Chamber of Deputies (Mexico)
Institutional Revolutionary Party politicians
21st-century Mexican politicians
21st-century Mexican women politicians
Deputies of the LX Legislature of Mexico
Members of the Chamber of Deputies (Mexico) for the State of Mexico